The Autovía A-75 (also known as Autovía Verín - Frontera Portuguesa) is an autovía in Galicia, Spain. It is 12.7 km (7.9 miles) long and runs, parallel to the N-532 road, from the Autovía A-52 near the small city of Verín to the Portuguese border at the village of Feces de Abaixo, where it connects with the A24 autoestrada to Chaves. It was opened in a joint ceremony on 19 June 2010 by the Spanish and Portuguese Ministers for Public Works.

References

A-75
A-75